Howard Stein (born January 21, 1929) is an American philosopher and historian of science. He is an emeritus professor at the University of Chicago.

Biography 
Stein was born on January 21, 1929, in New York City. He received a BA from Columbia University in 1947, where he studied under John Herman Randall Jr., Irwin Edman, and Ernest Nagel, before obtaining a PhD from the University of Chicago in 1958, and an MS from the University of Michigan in 1959. He joined the faculty of the University of Chicago in 1951 before teaching at Brandeis University, Case Western Reserve University and Columbia University. He also worked for Honeywell as a mathematician and engineer in between his teaching career. He returned to the University of Chicago in 1980 and retired in 2000.

Stein's work has centered around the philosophy of physics, as well as the history of physics and mathematics. His 1967 paper, "Newtonian Space Time," inaugurated the modern study of the foundations of physics.

Stein was elected to the American Academy of Arts and Sciences in 1989. He also received a Guggenheim Fellowship in 1974.

References 

1929 births
Living people
American philosophers
University of Chicago faculty
University of Chicago alumni
Columbia College (New York) alumni
University of Michigan alumni
Honeywell people
Brandeis University faculty
Case Western Reserve University faculty
Fellows of the American Academy of Arts and Sciences
Historians of science
American historians of mathematics
Philosophers of science
Philosophers of mathematics